Arthur Pine (born Arthur Pincus; April 20, 1917 – October 26, 2000) was an American publicist, literary agent, self-help author, composer and playwright. He is also widely credited as the man behind the initial incarnation of Citizenship Day.

Early life
He was born on April 20, 1917, in the Brighton Beach section of Brooklyn, the eldest of two sons born to Charles and Anna Pincus. While still in high school, the future publicist's pre-Pine byline found its way onto the pages of New York's Picture Newspaper when Pincus earned a five-dollar prize for his submission of the question ultimately selected for the December 9, 1934 edition of the paper's semi-regular person-on-the-street column, "The Inquiring Photographer."

Career
Arthur Pincus attended City College with every intention of pursuing a teaching career, but soon found that his heavy Brooklyn accent presented an all but insurmountable obstacle. Quickly shifting gears, he focused on finance, marketing and advertising while also writing and performing songs and plays. Accepting an entry-level position in an established firm, Pincus quickly attracted a number of music clients and resolved to start his own company. He realized, however, that a name change would be advisable; not merely for purposes of de-ethnicization, but also by way of distancing himself from the famously disreputable character "Pinkie Pincus," as then recently portrayed onstage by  comic Lou Holtz. Thus was born not only a legally named Arthur Pine, but also the Arthur Pine Agency and, not long after, Arthur Pine Associates.

Although at first, Pine's client base was composed primarily of performers (e.g. Gordon, Dinah Shore, Betty Madigan, Delores Gray, Betty Garrett, Lisa Kirk and Ella Logan), by the 1970s, the firm was functioning almost exclusively as a literary agency, albeit one with a high quotient of show-biz-related projects.

Notable clients
From Independent obituary, unless otherwise indicated.

 
Jim Bacon
Jack Benny
Milton Berle
George Burns
Sammy Cahn
Carroll Carroll
John Clive
Sonia Darrin
Jimmy Durante
Wayne Dyer
Blossom Elfman
Totie Fields
Betty Garrett
Gray Gordon
Dolores Gray
James Grippando
Red Holzman
Bob Hope
Billie Jean King
Lisa Kirk
Richard Kollmar
The Korn Kobblers
Hedy Lamarr
Michael LeBoeuf
Michael Levine,
Liberace 
Ella Logan
Betty Madigan
Michael Medved
Marc Olden
James Patterson
Susan RoAne
Dinah Shore
Phil Silvers
Jack Smith
Cameron Stauth
Sylvia Wallace
Walter Wanger
Jack M. Warner
Earl Wilson
Bob Wolff

Personal life
On December 24, 1950, at the Gramercy Park Hotel in Manhattan, Arthur Pine and fashion stylist Harriette Scheiner were married and remained so until his death nearly 50 years later, even as preparations were underway for their golden wedding anniversary. During the 1950s and sixties, the Pines raised two sons, David Jay and Richard S. Pine, Richard later becoming a member of his father's firm and eventually a prominent literary agent in his own right. Consequently, most, if not all, of Arthur Pine's subsequent composing and arranging credits bore the pseudonym Jay (or J.) Richards.

Works

Books
 Your Family Business: A Practical, Step-by-Step Guide for Making Both Your Relationships and Your Business Rewarding and Successful (1990)
 One Door Closes, Another Door Opens: Turning Your Setbacks Into Comebacks (1994), with Julie Houston
 Unexpected Roads: A Personal Success Journal (1995), with Julie Houston
 It Must Have Been a Miracle: Everyday Lives Touched by Miracles (1995), by Kelsey Tyler (joint pseudonym of Pine and Karen Kingsbury)

Musical Comedies
 Golden Glory (1939, un-produced; with Gray Gordon)
 High Tide (1943), optioned by Jerry Lester

Songs
 "We're In It, Let's Win It" (1942, with Leo Corday and Harold Grant)
 "Victory Polka" (1942, with Bernie Bierman)
 "The Big Sleep" (1946, with Sonia Darrin); never recorded, but performed and broadcast live on WOR on Saturday October 19, 1946
 "Just Like Sam" (1958, as Jay Richards, with Mort Garson and Earl Shuman)
 "Sandy the Sound Man" (1959, as Jay Richards, with Leonard Whitcup, Chet Gierlach)
 "The Wishing Song" (1960, as Jay Richards, with Eddy Manson)
 "The Forfeit Game" (1964, with Harriette Pine); on Jim Ameche's Humpty Dumpty

References

Further reading

Articles
 Orodenker, M. H. (January 17, 1942). “Selling the Band; Exploitation, Promotion and Showmanship Ideas: Army Girl”. ‘’The Billboard’’. 
 Broadcasting · Telecasting staff (September 1, 1947). "Allied Arts: Arthur Pine".  Broadcasting · Telecasting.
 Jemail, Jimmy (April 9, 1948). "The Inquiring Photographer". New York Daily News.
 Gallico, Paul (May 15, 1948). "The Underground: Course for Press Agents Gives Gallico the Shivers". Tampa Bay Times.
 Kleiner, Dick (March 25, 1954). "The Marquee: T.V.—Stage—Radio—Records—People". Casper Morning Star.
 Pine, Arthur (February 16, 1992). "Letters to the Long Island Editor: Cary Grant Recalled as Unpretentious". The New York Times.
 Pine, Arthur (January 9, 1994). "Q&A: In 'One Door Closes, Another Opens,' Arthur Pine tells how to turn setbacks into comebacks". The Chicago Tribune.

Miscellaneous
 Private correspondence between Pine and Herbert A. Simon regarding proposed book about 1996 Deep Blue-Garry Kasparaov match. CMU Digital Collections.

External links
 InkWell Management.

1917 births
2000 deaths
20th-century American non-fiction writers
American literary agencies
American male non-fiction writers
American people of Polish-Jewish descent
American people of Russian-Jewish descent
American publicists
American self-help writers
City College of New York alumni
City College of New York faculty
Literary agents
People from Brighton Beach
Writers from Brooklyn
20th-century American male writers